No. 14 Squadron (Bulls), is a ground attack unit, operating out of AFS Ambala. The squadron currently operates SEPECAT Jaguar IS and IBs, operational since March 1981.

History
Hunters of No. 14 Squadron battled with Sabres of the PAF in the Indo-Pakistani War of 1965. No. 14 Squadron was the first to be equipped with the state of the art Jaguar aircraft in 1979.

This squadron spent considerable part of their existence in Eastern India, first at Barrackpore Air Force Station, in the Calcutta suburbs and later at Kalaikunda, south-west of Calcutta. It was from this airbase they saw action, briefly during September 1965 and in December 1971. No. 14 Squadron had the unusual opportunity of being deployed at the captured PAF airbase of Jessore during the final stages of the Bangladesh war.

Aircraft

Aircraft types operated by the squadron

References

014
1981 establishments in India